Supphakorn Ramkulabsuk (born October 19, 1989) is a Thai professional footballer who plays as a striker.

Honours

Air Force Central
 Thai Division 1 League: 2013

External links
 Profile at Goal
 https://int.soccerway.com/players/supphakorn-ramkulabsuk/411484/

1989 births
Living people
Supphakorn Ramkulabsuk
Supphakorn Ramkulabsuk
Association football forwards
Supphakorn Ramkulabsuk
Supphakorn Ramkulabsuk
Supphakorn Ramkulabsuk
Supphakorn Ramkulabsuk
Supphakorn Ramkulabsuk
Supphakorn Ramkulabsuk